Jamaïque Vandamme (born 1 August 1985 in Ostend) is a Belgian retired footballer who played as a winger.

Career
He made his debut in professional football, being part of the KSV Roeselare squad in the 2004–05 season. He signed for Mons in July 2010. but joins KV Oostende (Division 2) for the season 2011-2012 and 2012–2013. In June 2013 it was announced that he would play for Royale Union Saint-Gilloise for the 2013–2014 season.

Coaching career
Vandamme joined KVV Coxyde in the summer 2016. In October, the club struggled financially and head coach Hugo Vandenheede decided to resign, why Vandamme was announced as a player-manager for the club. In April 2017 it was confirmed, that he would join K.F.C. Vigor Wuitens Hamme ahead of the 2017–18 season, this time as a playing manager from the beginning of the season.

In the summer 2020, Vandamme retired as a player. On 20 July 2020, he was appointed assistant coach at his former club, K.S.V. Roeselare, under newly appointed head coach Karel Fraeye. He left the club alongside the coach in September 2020, because the club Roeselare was bankrupt.

References

External links
 
 Jamaïque Vandamme at Footballdatabase

1985 births
Living people
Belgian footballers
Belgian expatriate footballers
R.S.C. Anderlecht players
K.S.V. Roeselare players
Roda JC Kerkrade players
R.A.E.C. Mons players
K.V. Oostende players
Royale Union Saint-Gilloise players
K.M.S.K. Deinze players
K.V.V. Coxyde players
Belgian Pro League players
Belgian Third Division players
Challenger Pro League players
Eredivisie players
Sportspeople from Ostend
Footballers from West Flanders
Association football midfielders
Expatriate footballers in the Netherlands
Belgian expatriate sportspeople in the Netherlands